Béla Erdélyi (born Béla Erdélyi, ukrainized Адальберт Ерделі, germanized Adalbert Erdeli; May 25, 1891 - September 19, 1955) was a Hungarian painter, one of the main figures of midcentury Transcarpathian art.

Erdeli was born in Kelemenfalva, Austria-Hungary (today Zahattia in Ukraine). He studied at the Budapest Academy of Arts from 1911 through 1915, then taught in Mukachevo and Uzhhorod, when Transcarpathia already became part of Czechoslovakia.

Along with fellow Budapest graduate and World War I veteran József Boksai, Erdelyi founded an art school in 1927, which eventually evolved into the Uzhhorod State Arts and Crafts College.  That institution is now the Transcarpathian Art Institute.  Erdelyi and Boksay are among the primary figures of the Transcarpathian stylistic school.

Among his students was Fedir Manailo. He died in Uzhhorod.

References

External links 

 YouTube documentary (German-language)

1891 births
1955 deaths
People from Zakarpattia Oblast
People from the Kingdom of Hungary
20th-century Hungarian painters
Czechoslovak painters
Soviet painters
Soviet people of Hungarian descent
People from Carpathian Ruthenia
Hungarian male painters
20th-century Hungarian male artists